A statue of José Martí by Anna Hyatt Huntington is installed in Manhattan's Central Park, in the U.S. state of New York.

Description and history
The monument features a bronze sculpture resting on a dark Barre granite pedestal designed by the architectural firm Clarke & Rapuano and donated by the Cuban government. The statue was cast in 1959, dedicated in May 1965, and conserved by the Central Park Conservancy in 1992 with funds raised by Cuban-Americans.

An inscription on the east side of the base reads: "APOSTOL DE LA INDEPENDENCIA / DE CUBA GUIA DE LOS PUEBLOS / AMERICANOS Y PALADIN DE LA / DIGNIDAD HUMANA SU GENIO / LITERARIO RIVALIZA CON SU / CLARIVIDENCIA POLITICA NACIO / EN HABANA EL 28 DE ENERO DE / 1853. VIVIO QUINCE ANOS DE SU / DESTIERRO EN LA CIUDAD DE NUEVA / YORK MURIO EN EL COMBATE DE / DOS RIOS PROVINCIA DE ORIENTE / EL 19 DE MAYO DE 1895." An inscription on the base's west side reads, "APOSTLE OF CUBAN INDEPENDENCE / LEADER OF THE PEOPLES OF AMERICA / AND DEFENDER OF HUMAN DIGNITY / HIS LITERACY GENIUS VIED WITH HIS / POLITICAL FORESIGHT. HE WAS BORN / IN HAVANA ON JANUARY 28, 1853 / FOR FIFTEEN YEARS OF HIS EXILE HE LIVED IN THE CITY OF NEW YORK. / HE DIED IN ACTION AT DOS RIOS IN / ORIENTE PROVINCE ON MAY 19, 1895."

See also

 1959 in art

References

External links
 

1959 sculptures
1965 establishments in New York City
Bronze sculptures in Central Park
Equestrian statues in New York City
Granite sculptures in New York City
Monuments and memorials in Manhattan
Cultural depictions of Cuban men
Outdoor sculptures in Manhattan
Sculptures in Central Park
Sculptures of men in New York City